Camila Paz Macaya (born 3 September 1990) is a Chilean badminton player. She competed at the 2011 and 2015 Pan American Games. She was the champion at the 2016 Chile International tournament in the mixed doubles event.

Achievements

BWF International Challenge/Series 
Women's singles

Women's doubles

Mixed doubles

  BWF International Challenge tournament
  BWF International Series tournament
  BWF Future Series tournament

References

External links 
 

1990 births
Living people
Chilean female badminton players
Badminton players at the 2011 Pan American Games
Badminton players at the 2015 Pan American Games
Pan American Games competitors for Chile
20th-century Chilean women
21st-century Chilean women